Juan Carlos Madrid Vidal (born 20 October 1975) is a Chilean former footballer who played as a forward for clubs in Chile and El Salvador.

Club career
A product of Deportes Temuco youth system, he took part of the squad in two stints: 1992–94, 2005–06.

After his first stint with Deportes Temuco, he joined Universidad Católica in 1994, making appearances for the club until 1996 and also in 2000. 

In 1997, 1998 and 1999 he played for Coquimbo Unido, Deportes Concepción and Deportes Puerto Montt respectively.

From 2001 to 2003, Madrid had a successful stint with Cobreloa. 

In 2004, he played for Deportes La Serena. 

In 2005, he played for Deportes Temuco when the club was relegated to the second level of the Chilean football, so he spent a half year in the 2006 Primera B, scoring four goals.

Abroad, he played for the Salvadoran club Alianza on second half 2006.

International career
He represented Chile at under-20 level in both the 1995 South American Championship and the 1995 FIFA World Youth Championship.

References

External links
 
 
 Juan Carlos Madrid at PlaymakerStats.com

1975 births
Living people
People from Valdivia
Chilean footballers
Chilean expatriate footballers
Chile under-20 international footballers
Deportes Temuco footballers
Club Deportivo Universidad Católica footballers
Coquimbo Unido footballers
Deportes Concepción (Chile) footballers
Puerto Montt footballers
Cobreloa footballers
Deportes La Serena footballers
Alianza F.C. footballers
Chilean Primera División players
Primera B de Chile players
Salvadoran Primera División players
Chilean expatriate sportspeople in El Salvador
Expatriate footballers in El Salvador
Association football forwards